The 2014–15 Tennessee Volunteers basketball team represented the University of Tennessee in the 2014–15 NCAA Division I men's basketball season. The team's head coach was Donnie Tyndall, who was in his first season at Tennessee. The team played their home games at the Thompson–Boling Arena in Knoxville, Tennessee as a member of the Southeastern Conference. They finished the season 16–16, 7–11 in SEC play to finish in tenth place. They advanced to the quarterfinals of the SEC tournament where they lost to Arkansas.

On March 27, head coach Donnie Tyndall, due to an investigation of violations committed when he was the head coach at Southern Miss, was fired after only one season.

Previous season
The Vols posted a record of 24–13 (11–7 SEC) in the 2012–13 season and finished in 4th place. They advance to the semifinals which they lost to Florida in the 2014 SEC men's basketball tournament. They received at-large bid to the 2014 NCAA Men's Division I Basketball Tournament which they lost to Michigan in the sweet 16.

Departures

Incoming Transfers

Recruiting

Roster

Schedule and results

|-
!colspan=9 style="background:#FF8200; color:white;"| Exhibition

|-
!colspan=9 style="background:#F77F00; color:white;"| Non-conference regular season

|-
!colspan=9 style="background:#F77F00; color:white;"| SEC regular season

|-
!colspan=9 style="background:#F77F00;"| SEC Tournament

See also
 2014–15 Tennessee Lady Volunteers basketball team

References

Tennessee
Tennessee Volunteers basketball seasons
Volunteers
Volunteers